Xınnakirən (also, Xınna Kirən and Khynnakiran) is a village and municipality in the Tovuz Rayon of Azerbaijan.  It has a population of 331.

References 

Populated places in Tovuz District